Goin' Down Slow is an album by saxophonist Sonny Stitt recorded in 1972 and released on the Prestige label.

Reception
In his review for Allmusic, Scott Yanow stated "Sonny Stitt was in one of his prime periods during the early '70s and this LP finds him in particularly creative form".

Track listing 
 "Miss Ann, Lisa, Sue and Sadie" (Sonny Stitt) - 14:10     
 "Where Is Love?" (Lionel Bart) - 4:23     
 "Livin' Without You" (Randy Newman) - 7:30     
 "Goin' Down Slow" (James Oden) - 3:54     
 "Moving Beauty" (Traditional) - 3:48

Personnel 
Sonny Stitt - alto saxophone, tenor saxophone
Thad Jones - trumpet
Hank Jones - piano
Billy Butler, Wally Richardson - guitar
George Duvivier - bass
Idris Muhammad - drums
Buddy Caldwell - congas, bells
Unidentified strings arranged and conducted by Billy Ver Planck

References 

1972 albums
Prestige Records albums
Sonny Stitt albums
Albums produced by Ozzie Cadena
Albums recorded at Van Gelder Studio